Asia Today is an Asian news programme produced by the BBC and was shown on BBC World News during the Asian morning hours, between 2003 and 2011. This programme used to be available exclusively in Asia Pacific, South Asia and Middle East but as of 1 February 2010 revamp was aired worldwide. It used to be broadcast from the BBC's London studios before being moved to the BBC's Singapore bureau which is in the CBD of Singapore. The main presenters were Sharanjit Leyl and Rico Hizon (Mon-Fri). The daily current affairs programme was aimed at viewers across Asia with in-depth reports from BBC correspondents and interviews with leading players. The programme was aired live twice and also repeated twice for a total of four airings each weekday. It has since been folded into Newsday.

References 

Asia Today

2003 British television series debuts
2011 British television series endings
BBC television news shows
BBC World News shows
British television news shows